1st Central Committee of the Workers' Party of Korea may refer to:

 1st Central Committee of the Workers' Party of North Korea
 1st Central Committee of the Workers' Party of South Korea